{{DISPLAYTITLE:C16H15Cl2N}}
The molecular formula C16H15Cl2N (molar mass: 256.75 g/mol) may refer to:

 Dasotraline
 Desmethylsertraline (DMS), also known as norsertraline
 Indatraline

Molecular formulas